Gholson Bridge is a historic metal Pratt truss bridge spanning the Meherrin River near Lawrenceville, Brunswick County, Virginia. It was built in 1884 by the Wrought Iron Bridge Company. It consists of two spans. It sits on an ashlar sandstone substructure.

The bridge was listed on the National Register of Historic Places in 1978.

See also
List of bridges documented by the Historic American Engineering Record in Virginia
List of bridges on the National Register of Historic Places in Virginia

References

External links

Historic American Engineering Record in Virginia
Road bridges on the National Register of Historic Places in Virginia
Bridges completed in 1884
Buildings and structures in Brunswick County, Virginia
National Register of Historic Places in Brunswick County, Virginia
Wrought iron bridges in the United States
Pratt truss bridges in the United States